Robert Jennings Leatham (born January 27, 1961 in Mesa, Arizona) is a professional shooter who is a 24-time USPSA National champion and 7-time International Practical Shooting Confederation (IPSC) World Champion.

Biography
On Leatham's twelfth birthday, he received his first gun.  His family surprised him with a new Smith & Wesson Model 34 revolver on one of their trips to shoot in the desert. 

He continued desert shooting throughout his teenage years and became involved in other sports such as basketball.

Competition shooting
Leatham's first competition took place in the late 1970s at a night shoot at the Mesa Police Department range.  He shot a Smith & Wesson Model 27 revolver with a 6-inch barrel loaded with 200-grain round-nose bullets that Leatham loaded himself, including a custom holster made by local leather worker, Jess Bird, who had built holsters for Leatham's father for years.  Leatham finished third revolver behind Mike Henry and Charlie Mills and cites this competition for causing his addiction to competitive shooting.

He invented the Modern Isosceles shooting stance in the 1980s. A few years later he began shooting the 9x25 dillon handgun round and brought that cartridge into the mainstream.

Leatham first shot the Steel Challenge and The Bianchi Cup in 1982. In 1985, he won the Triple Crown of practical pistol shooting: the IPSC US Nationals, the Bianchi Cup and the Steel Challenge.  He is the only competitor to ever win all three matches in the same year.

In 1989, he was offered a major contract with Springfield Armory, Inc. that enabled him to become a full-time, professional shooter. Since that time, Leatham has been practicing, competing, and conducting live-fire demonstrations for sponsors around the world.

Personal life 
Leatham married fellow Team Springfield member Kippi Boykin, a three-time USPSA National Champion.  They have one daughter together, Patience Leatham, and Leatham has 2 sons, Robert and Thomas, from a previous marriage.

Titles
24-Time USPSA National Champion: 1983–1986, 1988, 1989, 1994, 1995, 1998, 2000, 2001, 2002 (Limited), 2002 (Limited-10), 2003, 2004, 2005, 2006 (Single-Stack and Production), 2007 (Single-Stack and Limited), 2008 (Single-Stack), 2009 (Single-Stack), 2010 (Single-Stack)
6-Time IPSC World Champion as a member of 7-time winning "Team USA":
1983 - Virginia, USA
1986 - Florida, USA
1988 - Caracas, Venezuela,
2002 - Pietersburg, South Africa
2005 - Guayaquil, Ecuador
2014 - Florida, USA (Classic Division)
16-Time Single Stack Classic Champion: 1995–2010
7-Time Steel Challenge Champion: 1985, 1997, 1998, 2001, 2002 (Limited), 2002 (Open), 2009 (Production)
6-Time IDPA Custom Defensive Pistol (CDP) National Champion: 1997, 1998, 2000, 2001, 2002, 2004
7-Time NRA Bianchi Cup Champion: 1985, 2000, 2002, 2004, 2005, 2006, 2007, 2009
3-Time American Handgunner World Shootoff Champion: 1996, 2003, 2004
Triple Crown Winner: 1985 (Bianchi Cup, Steel Challenge, and the IPSC/USPSA  Nationals) - Leatham is the only person to ever achieve this
Captain, Team Springfield: Since its inception in 1985

See also 
 Brian Enos
 Ron Avery

References

External links
Rob Leatham's Official Website

1961 births
Living people
American male sport shooters
IPSC shooters
IPSC World Shoot Champions
Sportspeople from Mesa, Arizona